Renan Soares Reuter, better known as Renan, (born 12 December 1990 in São João Batista) is a Brazilian football goalkeeper who last played for Tigres do Brasil, on loan from Corinthians.

Club career
Renan began his professional career in Avaí, where he won the state championship. He was chosen as the first goalkeeper when his teammate Zé Carlos was injured, so he took the goalkeeper position at the beginning of 2010 Brazilian Série A.

Renan signed a five-year contract with Corinthians on 3 June 2011.

International career
On July 26, 2010, he was called up for the first time to the Brazilian national team. It was the first time that a footballer playing at a club from the Santa Catarina state received a cap for the national team.

Honours
Avaí
Campeonato Catarinense: 2010

Career statistics

References

1990 births
Living people
Brazilian footballers
Campeonato Brasileiro Série A players
Campeonato Brasileiro Série B players
Avaí FC players
Sport Club Corinthians Paulista players
Esporte Clube Vitória players
G.D. Estoril Praia players
Guarani FC players
Botafogo Futebol Clube (SP) players
Clube Atlético Bragantino players
Sociedade Esportiva e Recreativa Caxias do Sul players
Esporte Clube Tigres do Brasil players
Brazilian expatriate footballers
Expatriate footballers in Portugal
Brazilian expatriate sportspeople in Portugal
Association football goalkeepers
Brazilian people of German descent
Sportspeople from Santa Catarina (state)